The 1884 Presidential Election held in Kansas took place on November 4, 1884, as part of the 1884 United States presidential election. Voters chose nine representatives, or electors to the Electoral College, who voted for president and vice president.

Kansas was won by Republican nominee, James G. Blaine, over the Democratic nominee, Grover Cleveland. Blaine won the state by a margin of 24.18%.

With 58.08% of the popular vote, Kansas would prove to be Blaine's third strongest victory in terms of percentage in the popular vote after Vermont and Minnesota. The state would also prove to be Greenback Party candidate Benjamin Butler's second strongest state after Massachusetts.

Results

Results by county

See also
 United States presidential elections in Kansas

References

Kansas
1884
1884 Kansas elections